Richard Fremont Dauer (born July 27, 1952) is an American baseball former infielder and coach in Major League Baseball (MLB). He spent his entire 10-year MLB playing career with the Baltimore Orioles, winning the 1983 World Series. He was primarily a second baseman, and also played third base. Played San Bernardino Spirit baseball coach in the 1988 motion picture Stealing Home which starred Mark Harmon and Jodie Foster.

He was inducted into the Baltimore Orioles Hall of Fame in 2012.

Early years
Born in San Bernardino, California, Dauer graduated from Colton High School in 1970 and  played college baseball for the Indians of San Bernardino Valley College. He transferred to the University of Southern California in Los Angeles, where he was an All-American at third base and helped the Trojans win the College World Series in 1973 and 1974, USC's fifth consecutive title and sixth in seven years.

Pro playing career
Selected in the first round of the 1974 MLB draft in early June, Dauer was the 24th overall pick and began his pro career in the Single-A South Atlantic League with the Asheville Tourists. He moved up to the Rochester Red Wings of the Triple-A International League (IL) late in the 1975 season. The following season with the Red Wings, he won the league batting title with a .336 average, was named Rookie of the Year and shared Most Valuable Player honors with Mickey Klutts and Joe Lis. He was called up by the Orioles that year and struggled, getting only four hits in 39 at bats.

Dauer's struggles continued at the start of 1977, as he had just one hit in his first 41 at bats. He began the year as the Orioles' starting second baseman but lost the role to Billy Smith. He credited Brooks Robinson and Lee May with helping him out, saying, "You can't make it in the Majors by yourself." By the end of the year, he had regained the second base job from Smith. He batted .243 with 74 hits, 15 doubles, five home runs, and 25 RBI in 96 games while compiling a .982 fielding percentage at second base.

Dauer played in the 1979 postseason, and Orioles  defeated the California Angels in four games in the best-of-five 1979 American League Championship Series to secure the pennant, Baltimore's first since 1971. In the World Series, the O's built 3-1 lead, then lost the last three games to the Pittsburgh Pirates. He also played in the World Series in 1983, also known as "the I-95 Series," won by the Orioles over the Philadelphia Phillies in five games.

Dauer holds two American League single season fielding records for a second baseman, including 86 consecutive errorless games and 425 straight errorless chances, both set in 1978.

Dauer is one of the few players to have won a College World Series (twice) and an MLB World Series.

In 2012, Dauer was inducted into the Baltimore Orioles Hall of Fame, becoming the 12th member of the 1983 championship team to be inducted.

Coaching career

Dauer has worked as a minor league coach for five organizations, and managed the Seattle Mariners Class A San Bernardino Spirit affiliate in 1987. At the major league level, he coached for the Cleveland Indians, Kansas City Royals, Milwaukee Brewers and Colorado Rockies.

On December 19, 2012, he was named Manager of the Padres' Class AA affiliate, the San Antonio Missions.

Former teammate Lenn Sakata credited Dauer with helping him at shortstop in 1981 and 1982. "While I was at short, Rich gave me all the help and encouragement I needed. He was one of the best."

Dauer served as the first base coach for the Astros in 2017, where they won the World Series for the first time ever that year.

At the World Series parade Dauer suffered a subdural hematoma as a result of a head injury which required emergency brain surgery.

See also
List of Major League Baseball players who spent their entire career with one franchise

References

External links
, or SABR Biography Project, or Retrosheet

1952 births
Living people
Asheville Orioles players
Baltimore Orioles players
Baseball players from California
Cleveland Indians coaches
Colorado Rockies (baseball) coaches
Houston Astros coaches
Kansas City Royals coaches
Major League Baseball bench coaches
Major League Baseball second basemen
Major League Baseball third base coaches
Milwaukee Brewers coaches
Rochester Red Wings players
San Antonio Missions managers
San Bernardino Pride players
USC Trojans baseball players
Tiburones de La Guaira players
American expatriate baseball players in Venezuela
International League MVP award winners
Sportspeople from San Bernardino, California
People from Colton, California
All-American college baseball players
San Bernardino Valley College alumni